Jaathre is a 2015 Indian Kannada language drama film directed by Raviteja. It stars Chetan Chandra and Aishwarya Nag in the lead roles. The supporting cast features Ramesh Bhat, Usha Bhandary and Mitra.

Cast

 Chetan Chandra
 Aishwarya Nag
 Ramesh Bhat
 Usha Bhandary
 Mitra
 Shobhraj
 Master Anand
 Master Aashwick
 Akshay
 Veena Ponnappa
 Shravanth
 Sanathini
 Rakshit Shetty in a cameo appearance

Soundtrack

Manikanth Kadri of Savaari Fame has got new singers to sing for the soundtracks in the album and has composed the music for the soundtracks as well as the background score of the movie. The soundtrack features tracks sung by actor Puneeth Rajkumar along with Supriya Lohith, Santhosh Venky, Yazin Nizar and well established Karthik. The album consists of four tracks. It was released on 31 July 2015, in Bangalore.

Deccan Music Review and Rankings placed the track "Jeene Laga" and "Neenillada" as No.1 and No.2 tracks respectively. The track "Jeene Laga" was well received. The Hindu wrote, "The tune is easy-on-the-ears, with Bollywoodish Hindi phrases and a whiff of Latino strewn around. This is the kind of song that singer Karthik can sing incredibly well... in his sleep, and he lifts the song to new heights with his vocals."

References

External links
 
 

2015 films
Indian drama films
2015 drama films
2010s Kannada-language films